Dongnyeong Prefectures were administrative divisions of the Mongol-led Yuan dynasty of China located in the northwest Korean Peninsula between 1259 and 1290.

History
In October 1269, Choe Tan, Han Sin, Yi Yeon-nyeong, Gye Mun-bi and Hyeon Hyo-cheol rose in rebellion in order to exclude Im Yeon, Military Leader of Goryeo, and surrendered to Yuan dynasty with 60 prefectures and cities in northwest part of Goryeo. In following year, Yuan dynasty established Donggyeong prefecture at former west prefecture. Jabi Pass as a border belonged to Liaoyang ministry nominated Choe Tan as a commander.

In 1276, Donggyeong prefecture got promoted to Donggyeong circuit. This promotion there was no description in Goryeosa. Also in the clause of August, 1276 and February 1290, the description of Donggyeong prefecture can be seen. It is inferred that Donggyeong circuit was renamed as Donggyeong prefecture shortly.

After this, the political relationship between Yuan dynasty and Goryeo was strengthen. In July 1290, Donggyeong prefecture was abolished and jurisdiction was transfer to Goryeo. Donggyeong prefecture was ended its 20 years of history.

Controversy
In Goryeosa, there were some records (New year's clause in 1364, November's clause in 1369 and new year's clause in 1370) tells that Donggyeong prefecture was established in Yuan dynasty again.  However, there were no descriptions about Donggyeong prefecture in China's records after 1290. In the end of Yuan dynasty, it suddenly appeared in Goryeosa. There are two hypocrisies about this. One is that in 1290, Donggyeong prefecture was not abolished but transferred to Liaoyang area. And the other was that Donggyeong prefecture was abolished in 1290, but reestablished in Yuan dynasty in the period of confusion.

See also 
 Korea under Yuan rule
 Ssangseong Prefectures
Tamna prefectures

References 

Goryeo
History of Korea
Former commanderies of China in Korea
Prefectures of the Yuan dynasty